Phytometra is a genus of moths of the family Erebidae. The genus was described by Adrian Hardy Haworth in 1809.

Taxonomy
The genus has previously been classified in the subfamily Phytometrinae within Erebidae or in the subfamily Calpinae of the family Noctuidae.

Species
Some species of this genus are:
 Phytometra africana (Snellen, 1872)
 Phytometra apicata Barnes & McDunnough, 1916
 Phytometra carnea (Prout A. E., 1922)
 Phytometra coniota (Hampson, 1926)
 Phytometra curvifera (Hampson, 1926)
 Phytometra duplicalis (Walker, 1866)
 Phytometra ernestinana Blanchard, 1840 – Ernestine's moth
 Phytometra euchroa Hampson, 1918
 Phytometra formosalis Walker, 1866
 Phytometra haemaceps (Hampson, 1910)
 Phytometra haematoessa (Hampson, 1910)
 Phytometra helesusalis (Walker, 1859)
 Phytometra heliriusalis (Walker, 1859)
 Phytometra hypopsamma (Hampson, 1926)
 Phytometra laevis Swinhoe, 1901
 Phytometra lentistriata (Hampson, 1910)
 Phytometra luna Zerny, 1927
 Phytometra magalium (Townsend, 1958)
 Phytometra nigrogemmea Romieux, 1943
 Phytometra nyctichroa (Hampson, 1926)
 Phytometra obliqualis Dyar, 1912
 Phytometra orgiae Grote, 1875
 Phytometra olivescens (Hampson, 1910)
 Phytometra opsiphora (Hampson, 1926)
 Phytometra ossea (Saalmüller, 1891)
 Phytometra pentheus (Fawcett, 1916)
 Phytometra pyralomima (Wiltshire, 1961)
 Phytometra rhodopa (Bethune-Baker, 1911)
 Phytometra rhodarialis Walker, 1859 – pink-bordered yellow moth
 Phytometra sacraria (Felder & Rogenhofer, 1874)
 Phytometra sanctiflorentis Boisduval, 1834
 Phytometra signifera (Hampson, 1926)
 Phytometra silona (Schaus, 1893)
 Phytometra subflavalis (Walker, 1865)
 Phytometra umbrifera (Hampson, 1910)
 Phytometra viridaria Clerck, 1759 – small purple-barred
 Phytometra zotica (Viette, 1956)

References

Boletobiinae
Noctuoidea genera